Baptodoris mimetica is a species of sea slug or dorid nudibranch, a marine gastropod mollusk in the family Discodorididae.

Distribution
This species was described from Asilomar State Park, Pacific Grove, California, with additional specimens from Santa Cruz, Carmel and Isla San Martin, Baja California, Mexico.

Description

Ecology

References

Discodorididae
Gastropods described in 1991